The 2016–17 All-Ireland Senior Club Hurling Championship was the 47th staging of the All-Ireland Senior Club Hurling Championship since it began in the 1970-71 season. It is the Gaelic Athletic Association's premier inter-county club hurling tournament. The winners receive the Tommy Moore Cup.

The championship began on 2 October 2016 and ended on 17 March 2017.

On 17 March 2017, Cuala won the championship following a 2-19 to 1-10 defeat of Ballyea in the All-Ireland final. This was their first All-Ireland title and a first title for a Dublin club.

Cuala's David Treacy was the championship's top scorer with 0-39.

Na Piarsaigh were the 2015-16 champions. They failed to make it out of the group stage of the Limerick Senior Hurling Championship.

In the final on 17 March, Cuala from Dublin defeated Ballyea by 2-19 to 1-10 to claim their first ever title.

Format

County Championships

Ireland's counties play their county championships between their senior hurling clubs. Each county decides the format for determining their county champions. The format can be knockout, double-elimination, league, etc or a combination.

Provincial Championships

Leinster, Munster and Ulster organise a provincial championship for their participating county champions. Connacht do not organise a provincial championship and are represented in the All-Ireland semi-finals by the Galway champions. All matches are knock-out and extra time is played if it's a draw at the end of normal time.

All-Ireland

The two semi-finals are usually played on a Saturday in early February. The All-Ireland final is traditionally played in Croke Park on St. Patrick's Day, the 17th of March. All matches are knock-out. If it's a draw at the end of normal time in the semi-finals, extra time is played. If the final ends in a draw the match is replayed.

Initial Schedule

County championships April 2016 to November 2016
Provincial championships October 2016 to December 2016
All-Ireland semi-finals early February 2017
All-Ireland final 17 March 2017

Provincial championships

Leinster Senior Club Hurling Championship

Leinster Quarter-Finals

Leinster Semi-Finals

Leinster Final

Munster Senior Club Hurling Championship

Munster Quarter-Final

Munster Semi-Finals

Munster Final

Ulster Senior Club Hurling Championship

Ulster Quarter-Final

Ulster Semi-Finals

Ulster Final

All-Ireland Senior Club Hurling Championship

All-Ireland Semi-Finals

All-Ireland final

Top scorers

Overall

Single game

Team Summaries

References

2016 in hurling
2017 in hurling
All-Ireland Senior Club Hurling Championship